Albert DeMond (May 7, 1901 – February 20, 1973) was an American screenwriter.

Selected filmography
 His Foreign Wife (1927)
 On Your Toes (1927)
 The Fourflusher (1928)
 Phyllis of the Follies (1928)
 How to Handle Women (1928)
 Home, James (1928)
 The Cohens and the Kellys in Atlantic City (1929)
 Skinner Steps Out (1929)
 The Cohens and the Kellys in Scotland (1930)
 The Unshod Maiden (1932)
 Shadows of Sing Sing (1933)
 Take the Stand (1934)
 No Ransom (1934)
 Storm Over the Andes (1935)
 Unknown Woman (1935)
 The Perfect Clue (1935)
 Passport to Alcatraz (1940)
Fugitive from a Prison Camp (1940)
 The Great Swindle (1941)
 Call of the South Seas (1944)
 Madonna of the Desert (1948)
 The Red Menace (1949)
 Prince of the Plains (1949)
 Alias the Champ (1949)
 Trial Without Jury (1950)
 Million Dollar Pursuit (1951)
 Marshal of Cedar Rock (1953)

References

Bibliography
  Len D. Martin. The Republic Pictures Checklist: Features, Serials, Cartoons, Short Subjects and Training Films of Republic Pictures Corporation, 1935-1959. McFarland, 1998.

External links

1901 births
1973 deaths
20th-century American screenwriters